In ancient Egypt, a rope stretcher (or harpedonaptai) was a surveyor who measured real property demarcations and foundations using knotted cords, stretched so the rope did not sag. The practice is depicted in tomb paintings of the Theban Necropolis. Rope stretchers used 3-4-5 triangles and the plummet, which are still in use by modern surveyors.

The commissioning of a new sacred building was a solemn occasion in which pharaohs and other high-ranking officials personally stretched ropes to define the foundation. This important ceremony, and therefore rope-stretching itself, are attested over 3000 years from the early dynastic period to the Ptolemaic kingdom.

Rope stretching technology spread to ancient Greece and India, where it stimulated the development of geometry and mathematics.

See also 
 Gromatici
 Surveying
 Trigonometry

References

 
 The New Encyclopædia Britannica, Encyclopædia Britannica 1974
 James Henry Breasted Ancient Records of Egypt, Part Two, Chicago 1906
 Joel F. PAULSON, "Surveying in Ancient Egypt,", FIG Working Week 2005 and GSDI-8, Cairo, Egypt April 16-21, 2005.

External links
 surveying instruments
 proportions "The knowledge of pleasing proportions of the rope stretchers was incorporated by the Greeks"
 Sangaku and The Egyptian Triangle

Ancient Egypt
Ancient Egyptian technology
Surveying
Egyptian inventions